Tomara tigrinella is a species of moth, found on Borneo. It is the only species in the genus Tomara, and belongs to the family Tineidae.

References

External links

Tineidae
Moths described in 1864
Moths of Asia
Taxa named by Francis Walker (entomologist)